Barry "Fairy" Heatlie (25 April 1872 – 19 August 1951) was a rugby union player, representing  both South Africa and Argentina. He was the fifth captain of the South African rugby union team and is attributed as the man who gave the Springboks their famous green jersey.

His contributions to the early development of South African rugby were recognised in 2009 with his induction into the IRB Hall of Fame.

Notes and references

External links
 The Captian who gave South Africa it's National Colours

See also
 South African rugby union captains

Bibliography
 Difford, Ivor The History of South African Rugby
 Clayton, Keith Legends of South African Rugby
 Dobsin, Paul Bishops Rugby
 Parker, A.C. W.P.Centenary 1883 - 1983
 Craven, Danie Springbok Annals 1891 - 1964
 Dobson, Paul Rugby in South Africa 1861 - 1988
 Greyvenstein, Chris Springbok Rugby: An Illustrated History
 Parker, A.C. The Springboks 1891 - 1970
 Stent, R.K. 100 Years of Rugby
 Dobson, Paul 30 Super Springboks

1872 births
1951 deaths
Villager FC players
South African people of British descent
People from Worcester, South Africa
South African rugby union players
Naturalized citizens of Argentina
South Africa international rugby union players
World Rugby Hall of Fame inductees
Argentine rugby union players
Argentina international rugby union players
White South African people
Rugby union players from Worcester, South Africa
Rugby union locks